The Hope River (Jamaica) is a river of Jamaica. It flows from 15 miles north of Kingston and then forms a delta at Kingston.

See also
List of rivers of Jamaica

References
 GEOnet Names Server
OMC Map
CIA Map
Ford, Jos C. and Finlay, A.A.C. (1908).The Handbook of Jamaica. Jamaica Government Printing Office

Rivers of Jamaica